Tina Datta (born 27 November 1991) is an Indian actress known for her work in Hindi television. She rose to fame after portraying Ichcha in the drama series Uttaran for which she won the Producers Guild Award for Best Actress. She went on to participate in stunt-based reality show Khatron Ke Khiladi 7 and reality series Bigg Boss 16.

Life and family 
Datta was born in Kolkata on 27 November 1991 to Madhumita Datta and Tapan Datta. She has an older brother named Debraj.

Datta is an avid yoga and pilates enthusiast. During the lockdown, she decided to switch from functional and weight training to yoga. Additionally, the actress is well versed in pole dancing and kickboxing.

Career

Child artist and early roles (1996–2008)
Datta made her debut at the age of five with the show Sister Nivedita. A year later, she made her film debut as a child artist with the Bengali film Pita Maata Santan. She went on to act in many Bengali films some of which are Dus Number Bari and Sagarkanya. She has also acted in several Bengali television series one of which being Khela. Datta starred in Rituparno Ghosh's film Chokher Bali alongside Aishwarya Rai. She further played young Lalita in Vidya Balan and Saif Ali Khan's 2005 cult movie Parineeta. Datta auditioned for the role of in Kolkata and Pradeep Sarkar, who was looking for a Bengali face to play the role really liked her and said she was perfect for the role. In 2008, she starred in the Bengali mythology drama television series Durga where she played Kumkum Roy Choudhary.

Breakthrough and recognition (2009–2021)

From 2009 to 2015, Datta starred as Ichcha Bundela and Meethi Bundela opposite Nandish Sandhu and Mrunal Jain in Uttaran, the third longest-running Indian television series of Colors TV. Her performance earned her widespread acclaim and several accolades including the Producers Guild Award for Best Actress in a Drama Series.

In 2016, she participated in Colors TV's stunt-based reality show Fear Factor: Khatron Ke Khiladi 7 where she finished at the 12th position. From 2017 to 2018, she played Dhamini in the mythology drama Karmaphal Daata Shani. In 2019, Datta portrayed Jhanvi Mourya and Kundani Roy in &TV's paranormal romance drama series Daayan.

In 2020, she played Ketki Maheshwari opposite Rajeev Khandelwal in ZEE5's crime thriller web series Naxalbari which revolves around an STF agent who goes on a mission to suppress the revival of a Naxal uprising in Gadchiroli. India Today said, "Tina Datta breathes a fresh aura into Ketki, a translator who works with government agencies." She won the Global Fame Award for Best OTT Debut for her portrayal in the series. In 2021, Datta made her music video debut by starring in Mika Singh's Bengali song Durga Maa Elo Re.

Bigg Boss and further work (2022–present)
 	
From 2022 to 2023, she participated in Colors TV's captive reality show Bigg Boss 16. She finished at the eighth place after spending 119 days in the house. Datta was the second highest paid contestant of the season. Since April 2023, she has been starring as Surili in Sony TV's Hum Rahe Na Rahe Hum opposite Jay Bhanushali.

Media image
Datta was ranked 19th in Times of Indias Most Desirable Women List 2019.

Filmography

Films

Television

Special appearances

Web series

Music videos

Awards and nominations

References

External links

 
 

Living people
21st-century Indian actresses
Actresses in Hindi cinema
Actresses in Bengali cinema
Indian television actresses
Indian film actresses
Indian soap opera actresses
Fear Factor: Khatron Ke Khiladi participants
1991 births